The 1986–87 1. FC Nürnberg season was the 87th year of existence. The club was the record-champions up until the end of the season.

Review and events
1. FC Nürnberg finished the season in 9th place and lost the title of record-champions.

Match results

Legend

Bundesliga

1.Match times before 26 October 1986 and after 28 March 1987 were played in Central European Summer Time. Match times from 26 October 1986 to 28 March 1987 were played in Central European Time.
2.1. FC Nürnberg goals listed first.
3. Originally Matchday 27.
4. Originally Matchday 20.
5. Originally Matchday 21.
6. Originally Matchday 22.
7. Originally Matchday 23.
8. Originally Matchday 24.
9. Originally Matchday 25.
10. Originally Matchday 26.

DFB-Pokal

Player information

Roster and statistics

Transfers

In

Out

Sources

Match reports

Other sources

1. FC Nürnberg seasons
Nurnberg